Frederick Edward Neuflize "Eric" Ponsonby, 10th Earl of Bessborough DL (29 March 1913 – 5 December 1993), styled Viscount Duncannon from 1920 to 1956, was a British diplomat, businessman, playwright, Conservative politician, and peer.

Early life
Ponsonby was the eldest and only surviving son of Vere Ponsonby, 9th Earl of Bessborough, and his wife, the former Roberte Poupart de Neuflize, only daughter of Baron Jean de Neuflize, a Parisian banker. His father was an Anglo-Irish businessman and politician who graduated with a law degree from Cambridge University before entering politics as a member of the London County Council and then, in 1910, as a member of the British House of Commons, later serving as Governor General of Canada.

He was educated at Eton and Trinity College, Cambridge.

Career
He was on the Staff of the League of Nations High Commission for Refugees from Germany between 1936 and 1939. In 1938, he attended the Évian Conference as secretary to the High Commissioner Sir Neill Malcolm.

During the Second World War he served in France and West and North Africa, achieving the rank of captain in the 98th (Surrey and Sussex Yeomanry) Field Regiment of the Royal Artillery (TA Reserve). From 1944 to 1948 Bessborough was 2nd Secretary at the British Embassy in Paris and from 1948 to 1949 1st Secretary. He then worked for Robert Benson, Lonsdale & Co, Ltd, merchant bankers, between 1950 and 1956 and was a director of ATV Ltd between 1955 and 1963.

Bessborough succeeded to his father's two earldoms in 1956 and took his seat on the Conservative benches in the House of Lords. He served under Sir Alec Douglas-Home as Parliamentary Secretary for Science from 1963 to 1964 and as Joint Under-Secretary of State for Education and Science in 1964 and under Edward Heath as Minister of State at the Ministry of Technology in 1970. From 1973 to 1979 he was a Member of the European Parliament. He also served as a Deputy Lieutenant of West Sussex in 1977 and was the author of plays and other works. He was elected to the American Philosophical Society in 1988.

Personal life

In August 1948, his engagement to American heiress Mary Munn (1915–2013) was announced. The couple met in Paris where Lord Bessborough, then Viscount Duncannon, was attached to the British Embassy and his future wife was working for the Red Cross. Mary was the daughter of Charles A. Munn Jr. and Mary Astor Paul (a granddaughter of Philadelphia banker Anthony Drexel). They married on 29 September 1948, and were the parents of one daughter, Lady Charlotte Mary Roberte Paul Ponsonby (b. 1949), an art gallery owner who married Yanni Petsopoulos in 1974, and the couple has one son, Eric.

Lord Bessborough died in December 1993, aged 80, when the earldom of Bessborough created in the Peerage of the United Kingdom for his father in 1937 became extinct. He was succeeded in the Irish earldom of Bessborough and the remaining family titles by his first cousin, Arthur Ponsonby.

Ancestry

References

External links

1913 births
1993 deaths
Alumni of Trinity College, Cambridge
British Army personnel of World War II
British Yeomanry officers
Conservative Party (UK) MEPs
Deputy Lieutenants of Essex
Earls in the Peerage of the United Kingdom
Frederick 10
MEPs for the United Kingdom 1973–1979
Ministers in the Macmillan and Douglas-Home governments, 1957–1964
People educated at Eton College
Frederick Ponsonby, 10th Earl of Bessborough
Royal Artillery officers
Members of the American Philosophical Society